Starlord is a science-fiction strategy game developed by Third Millennium Software and published by MicroProse in 1993.

External links 

Atari ST games
Amiga games
DOS games
1993 video games
MicroProse games
Strategy video games
Video games developed in the United Kingdom